The Anza (عنزہ Anza) is a series of shoulder-fired, man-portable surface-to-air missiles produced by Pakistan. Guided by an infrared homing seeker, the Anza is used for short range air defence.

The Anza is produced by Kahuta Research Laboratories (KRL), being one of the facility's main conventional weapons projects. Development was originally undertaken to eliminate dependence on importing expensive foreign systems. Various versions of the Anza are currently in service with the Pakistan Army, with the Mk-III version being the most recent. The Anza is also offered for export, Malaysia being its only known export customer after receiving 100 Anza Mk-I in 2002 and, later, a further 500 Anza Mk-II systems.

Development and design
Some sources state that the Anza Mk-II was co-developed in a joint project by Pakistan and China.

The Anza Mk-I entered service with the Pakistan Army in January 1990, followed by the Anza Mk-II in September 1994. Serial production of Anza Mk-III for the Pakistan Army was announced in 2006.

In recent years, Pakistan has advertised the Anza series for export, displaying it at the International Defense Exhibition (IDEX) 2007 event in the United Arab Emirates and at the IDEAS 2008 defence exhibition in Pakistan.

Training aids
The Mk-II is known to have the ATS-II Training Simulator included, which consists of a set of four Mk-II training missiles, four firing units, simulated ground batteries, cable interconnectors, PC-based control, monitoring and scoring unit with a target simulator made up of an infrared electric bulb moving along an overhead wire.

The High Speed Aerial Target Drone, or HISAT-DK, is a high speed, low maintenance target drone that can be used in training operators to use the Anza. It is manned by a four-man crew using Optical Tracking Pod devices. The drones can be used for MANPAD training, though they are also used for other purposes, such as artillery fire support training.

Variants
 Anza Mk-I - The first MANPADS produced by Pakistan for use by the Pakistan Army. Development is based on the Chinese HN-5B MANPADS. A British source the Anza is a copy of the SA-7 Grail. Approximately 1000 Anza Mk-I were produced between 1989 and 1998.

 Anza Mk-II - A third generation MANPADS, believed to be based on the Chinese QW-1 MANPADS. Uses a dual-band, cross-scan infrared homing seeker to counter decoy flares. Also believed to use American missile technology. Approximately 2450 Anza Mk-II were produced between 1994 and 2020.
 Anza Mk-III - Believed to be based on the Chinese QW-2 MANPADS, modifications made to meet Pakistan Army requirements include increased range up to 5 km, improved sensors and a new firing unit similar to the Russian 9K38 Igla MANPADS.  All-aspect attack capability and improved ECCM capability. It also has a vehicle-mounted launcher variant.

Operators

 Pakistan Army- Large numbers of Mk.I, Mk.II and Mk.III are in service.

 Malaysian Army - 100 Anza Mk-I systems, received in 2002. 500 Anza MK.II systems delivered as part of a RM446 million arms deal with Pakistan, used to arm the 10th Paratrooper Brigade.

Operational history
On 27 May 1999, the Anza Mk-II was used by the Pakistan Army's Air Defence Forces to shoot down an Indian Mig-21 and Mi-17 during the Kargil conflict.

In December 2002, The Indian media sources claimed that their soldiers found an Anza Mk-I in a militant hideout near the Line of Control in Kupwara, Kashmir. An Anza system had previously been found at a militant hideout by Indian Army soldiers in 2001.
In 2002, Indian media sources again claimed that an Anza MANPAD was fired at an Indian Air Force Antonov An-32 over the Line of Control; the plane was able to land safely.

In 2004, Saudi Assistant Minister for Defense Prince Khaled ibn Sultan of Saudi Arabia and Defense Minister Rao Sikandar Iqbal of Pakistan had been in talks for joint production of the Anza.

In 2008, the Pakistan Army conducted exercises with the Anza Mk-II  in a semi-desert area near Muzaffargarh in response to covert attacks on targets in north-west Pakistan by American unmanned aerial vehicles (UAV), also known as drones. In November 2008, the chief of the Pakistan Air Force told reporters that his forces are fully capable of shooting down the American drones but it was the responsibility of the government to decide whether the drone attacks were stopped through diplomacy or military engagement. In the 2010 Azm-e-Nau 3 exercises, the air defence of Pakistan Army exhibited accurate targeting of enemy's aircraft while in its attacking position, with a pinpoint precision through shoulder operated system of Anza Missiles

Specifications

Comparable systems
 FIM-92 Stinger
 Grom (missile)
 Mistral (missile)
 Starstreak missile
 9K38 Igla
 RBS 70
 QW-3
 KP-SAM Shingung

References

External links
Anza MKI - Pakistan 

Surface-to-air missiles of Pakistan
Guided missiles of Pakistan
Military equipment introduced in the 1980s